Thomas Shawn Kleeh (born September 14, 1974) is the Chief United States district judge of the United States District Court for the Northern District of West Virginia.

Biography 

Kleeh was born and raised in Wheeling, West Virginia and graduated from Wheeling Central High School. He earned his Bachelor of Business Administration from West Virginia University and his Juris Doctor from the West Virginia University College of Law, where he was inducted into the Order of the Coif.

From 1999 to 2018, he practiced with Steptoe & Johnson PLLC, and specialized in labor and employment issues covering both the public and private sectors. He rose to become a member of the firm before becoming a judge. He also served as counsel to the West Virginia Senate's Committee on the Judiciary.

Federal judicial service 

In the summer of 2017, Kleeh met with Senators Shelley Moore Capito and Joe Manchin and received their recommendation to the Trump administration for a federal judgeship. On February 12, 2018, President Donald Trump announced his intent to nominate Kleeh to an undetermined seat on the United States District Court for the Northern District of West Virginia. On February 15, 2018, his nomination was sent to the Senate. President Trump nominated Kleeh to the seat vacated by Judge Irene Patricia Murphy Keeley, who assumed senior status on August 12, 2017. On April 25, 2018, a hearing on his nomination was held before the Senate Judiciary Committee. On May 24, 2018, his nomination was reported out of committee by a 14–7 vote. On October 11, 2018, his nomination was confirmed by a 65–30 vote. He received his judicial commission on November 5, 2018. He became Chief Judge on March 19, 2022.

As of 2022, Kleeh is overseeing the trial for the murder of Whitey Bulger.

References

External links 
 

1974 births
Living people
20th-century American lawyers
21st-century American lawyers
21st-century American judges
Judges of the United States District Court for the Northern District of West Virginia
Lawyers from Wheeling, West Virginia
United States district court judges appointed by Donald Trump
University of Charleston
West Virginia University alumni
West Virginia University College of Law alumni